Unclick is a term, increasingly applied in the context of computing, in which a computer user un-chooses or de-selects a specific preference, typically by moving a cursor over a selection, and pressing the left mouse button. As a result, the check mark image or dark circle inside a checkbox or a radio button is removed. While in January 2012 the term unclick is generally not formally defined in dictionaries, the term has been used in popular parlance in countries such as the United States, Britain, and Canada.

Background
As the Internet becomes an increasingly popular medium for marketers, vendors and marketers often presume that a user will prefer certain choices, such as receiving emails in the future, having specific computer settings, or preferring that specific programs will be operational when a computer is turned on. As a result, it is sometimes necessary for a user to unclick these choices to avoid exposure to unwanted advertising, or to avoid a situation in which a different website is chosen for one's home page. In Internet marketing, unclicking is often required for a user to avoid being billed automatically for unnecessary services, sometimes part of a deceptive business practice termed negative option billing. A user's Facebook privacy settings have often been chosen in advance by Facebook Inc., which presumes that a user would like particular settings, and to un-choose these options, a user may need to unclick or opt-out of the Facebook-determined choices by finding the right menus. According to behavioral economics, computer and Internet users have a general tendency to go along with a default setting.

Other contexts
The term unclick has also been used in other contexts, such as when there is a latching or locking mechanism, such as a lock on a briefcase, or seat belts in a car or airplane, or door lock, or other mechanisms which typically make a "clicking" sound. In these contexts, unclicking means to open the latch or seat belt. It has also been used in the context of guns, in which a safety catch is "unclicked", or flooring materials in which pieces are interlocked, The term has been used to describe the act of answering a cell phone by pressing on a button when it is ringing.

References

Direct marketing
Information privacy
Computing terminology